Violante Inlet is an ice-filled inlet  long, in an east–west direction, and  wide, lying between Cape Fanning and Cape Herdman along the east coast of Palmer Land. Discovered and photographed from the air in December 1940 by members of the United States Antarctic Service (USAS) and named for Maj. (later Col.) Andre L. Violante, USA, who designed the prefabricated buildings used by the expedition. Particularly because of a false floor, they proved to be the must satisfactory quarters used by American Antarctic expeditions.

See also
Heirtzler Ice Piedmont

References

Inlets of Palmer Land